Gavin Jones may refer to:

 Gavin Jones (demographer) (1940–2022), Australian demographer
 Gavin Jones (media executive) (1966–2014), Australian media producer
 Gavin Jones (rugby league), Australian former rugby league footballer 
 Gavin Jones (squash player) (born 1980), Welsh squash player

See also 
 Gavin Price-Jones, rugby league footballer for Wales